Claudia Beer (born 4 October 1993) is a German curler.

Teams

References

External links

Living people
1993 births
German female curlers

Competitors at the 2017 Winter Universiade
Place of birth missing (living people)
Sportspeople from Hamburg